Neil Vasdev is a Canadian and American radiochemist and expert in nuclear medicine and molecular imaging, particularly in the application of PET. Radiotracers developed by the Vasdev Lab are in preclinical use worldwide, and many have been translated for first-in-human neuroimaging studies. He is the Director and Chief Radiochemist of the Brain Health Imaging Centre and Director of the Azrieli Centre for Neuro-Radiochemistry at the Centre for Addiction and Mental Health (CAMH).  He is the Tier 1 Canada Research Chair in Radiochemistry and Nuclear Medicine, the endowed Azrieli Chair in Brain and Behaviour and Professor of Psychiatry at the University of Toronto. Vasdev has been featured on Global News, CTV, CNN, New York Times, Toronto Star and the Globe and Mail for his innovative research program.

Vasdev began his independent faculty career at CAMH/University of Toronto in 2004. From 2011–2017 he served as the Director of Radiochemistry and an Associate Centre Director at the Massachusetts General Hospital and served as an Associate Professor in the Department of Radiology at Harvard Medical School from 2012–2022. He was recruited back to CAMH and the University of Toronto in November 2017.

Life and education 
Vasdev grew up in Oakville, Ontario, Canada. He attended Oakville Trafalgar High School and graduated from McMaster University in 1998 with double bachelor degrees, summa cum laude, Hon. BSc in Chemistry and B.A. in Psychology. He concurrently worked as chemist at Astra Pharma and Glaxo-Wellcome. He then earned his Doctorate of Chemistry, supported by NSERC, at McMaster University in 2003, under the supervision of Professors Raman Chirakal and Gary J. Schrobilgen. He continued training with a NSERC postdoctoral fellowship in the Department of Nuclear Medicine and Functional Imaging at the Lawrence Berkeley National Laboratory, mentored by Henry F. VanBrocklin. He is an active member of several chemistry and nuclear medicine/imaging societies and scientific journals including the ACS, CSC, SRS, WMIS, and SNMMI.

Honours and awards 
Scholarly and academic awards of Vasdev's career include:
 Fellow of Society of Nuclear Medicine and Molecular Imaging in 2021, for his distinguished service to the Society, and exceptional achievement in the field of nuclear medicine and molecular imaging.
 Fellow of American Chemical Society in 2020, for his outstanding achievements and contributions to science, the profession and the Society.
 Fellow of Royal Society of Chemistry in 2020, for his impact to the field of chemical sciences
 Research award of John R. Evans Leaders Fund 2019–2024 (specialty: Radiochemistry) from Canada Foundation for Innovation. This funding supports his proposal: "Automated apparatus for PET radiopharmaceuticals to image the living human brain"
 Research award of Endowed Azrieli Chair in Brain and Behaviour 2018–2023 (Specialty: Neuroimaging) from University of Toronto.
 Research Award of Tier 1 Canada Research Chair in Radiochemistry and Nuclear Medicine 2017–2024 (specialty: Radiochemistry and Nuclear Medicine) from Canadian Institutes for Health Research (CIHR).
 Leaders Opportunity Fund (Research Infrastructure) 2009–2014 (specialty: Radiochemistry) from Canadian Foundation for Innovation.

Research statements

Iodonium ylide precursors for 18F-labeling 
Current methods to radiofluorinate non-activated aromatic rings are generally limited to esoteric electrophilic [18F]F2 reactions, transition-metal mediated, or iodonium salt based methods. The Vasdev Lab has a long-established history of labeling non-activated aromatics and recently discovered a simple synthetic strategy for incorporating [18F]fluoride into non-activated aromatic molecules using spirocyclic iodoium ylide based precursors. Based on their paper in Nature Communications, a patent has been licensed by the pharmaceutical industry to employ this method for the synthesis of radiopharmaceuticals in humans. Hence, the iodonium ylide technology for fluorination represents a major advance for PET imaging.

11C-fixation strategies 
There is a need for new methods of 11C radiosynthesis because current methods are largely limited to methylation. The Vasdev lab has co-developed new techniques of 11CO2 fixation that are suitable for human use with diverse precursors synthesized by labeling at the carbonyl group (rather than the common methyl group). This methodology can label 11C-carbamates for imaging the enzyme FAAH ([11C]CURB) or 11C-oxazolidinones for imaging MAO-B (11C-SL25.1188), both of which they have translated for human use. They have also synthesized 11C-ureas and a 11C-carboxylic acid (11C-Bexarotene).

New PET radiopharmaceuticals for Alzheimer's disease and brain injuries 
Vasdev has introduced new radiochemical methods and radiopharmaceuticals for imaging the living human brain. The Vasdev Lab is exploring new ways to image neuroinflammation and tau protein. He is the co-inventor of the method patent for the first and only FDA-approved tau-PET radiopharmaceutical TauvidTM that has been employed worldwide to image patients with Alzheimer's disease (AD) and related dementias, as well as patients with symptomatic traumatic brain injuries, including professional athletes and military veterans. The Vasdev Lab is partnering with Concussion Legacy Foundation Canada and the Canadian Military to work on the Project Enlist to study whether some military training exercises could be negatively impacting long-term brain health. “We are getting very close to advancing new radio tracers in humans to image the tau that is more prevalent in C.T.E.”.

Selected publications 
Vasdev has over 10 families of patents and has published more than 150 peer-reviewed papers including:

References

External links 
 

Canadian psychiatrists
Fellows of the American Chemical Society
Fellows of the Royal Society of Chemistry
Lawrence Berkeley National Laboratory people
Living people
McMaster University alumni
Neuroimaging researchers
Radiochemistry
Academic staff of the University of Toronto
Year of birth missing (living people)